Ariel Macia (born October 22, 1970, in San Miguel, Argentina) is a former Argentine footballer who played for clubs of Argentina, Chile and Guatemala.

Teams
  Atlanta 1990-1996
  Chacarita Juniors 1996-1997
  Instituto 1997-1998
  Independiente Rivadavia 1998-2000
  Palestino 2001-2002
  Comunicaciones 2002-2004
  Palestino 2004
  Deportivo Marquense 2005
  Deportivo Jalapa 2006
  Deportivo Merlo 2006

Titles
  Comunicaciones 2002-03 (Torneos Apertura y Clausura)

References
 Profile at BDFA 

1970 births
Living people
Argentine footballers
Argentine expatriate footballers
Independiente Rivadavia footballers
Chacarita Juniors footballers
Club Atlético Atlanta footballers
Instituto footballers
Club Deportivo Palestino footballers
Comunicaciones F.C. players
Deportivo Jalapa players
Deportivo Marquense players
Expatriate footballers in Chile
Expatriate footballers in Guatemala
Association footballers not categorized by position